Alfred Sherwood Romer  (December 28, 1894 – November 5, 1973) was an American paleontologist and biologist and a specialist in vertebrate evolution.

Biography
Alfred Romer was born in White Plains, New York, the son of Harry Houston Romer and his wife, Evalyn Sherwood. He was educated at White Plains High School.

He studied at Amherst College for his Bachelor of Science Honours degree in biology, then at Columbia University for an M.Sc in Biology and a doctorate in zoology in 1921.  Romer joined the department of geology and paleontology at the University of Chicago as an associate professor in 1923. He was an active researcher and teacher.  His collecting program added important Paleozoic specimens to Chicago's Walker Museum of Paleontology.  In 1934 he was appointed professor of biology at Harvard University. In 1946, he became director of the Harvard Museum of Comparative Zoology (MCZ). Romer was elected to the American Academy of Arts and Sciences in 1937. In 1951, he was elected to the American Philosophical Society. In 1954 Romer was awarded the Mary Clark Thompson Medal from the National Academy of Sciences, of which he was a member. He was awarded the Academy's Daniel Giraud Elliot Medal in 1956. In 1961, Romer received the Golden Plate Award of the American Academy of Achievement.

Evolutionary research
Romer was a keen practical student of vertebrate evolution. Comparing facts from paleontology, comparative anatomy, and embryology, he taught the basic structural and functional changes that happened during the evolution of fishes to ancestral terrestrial vertebrates and from these to all other tetrapods. He always emphasized the evolutionary significance of the relationship between form and function of animals and their environment.

Through his textbook Vertebrate Paleontology, Romer laid the foundation for the traditional classification of vertebrates. He drew together the then widely scattered taxonomy of the different vertebrate groups and combined them into a single scheme, emphasizing orderliness and overview. Based on his research into early amphibians, he reorganised the labyrinthodontians. Romer's classification has been followed by many subsequent authors, notably Robert L. Carroll, and is still in use.

Kronosaurus queenslandicus skeleton controversy

Prior to Romer's tenure as MCZ director, the Museum sent an expedition to Australia in 1931–1932 to gather specimens and study live animals. Then-graduate student William E. Schevill, the team's fossil enthusiast, remained in Australia afterward and, in the winter of 1932, was told by the rancher R.W.H. Thomas of rocks on his property near Hughenden with something "odd" poking out of them. The rocks were limestone nodules that contained the most complete skeleton of a Kronosaurus ever discovered. After dynamiting the nodules out of the ground (and into smaller pieces weighing approximately four tons), William Schevill shipped the fossils back to Harvard for examination and preparation. The skull—which matched the holotype jaw fragment of K. queenslandicus—was prepared right away, but time and budget constraints put off restoration of the nearly complete skeleton for 20 years - most of the bones of which remained unexcavated within the limestone blocks. Work resumed when the material came to the attention of Godfrey Lowell Cabot - Boston industrialist, philanthropist, and founder of the Cabot Corporation - "who was then in his nineties but had been interested in sea serpents since childhood." 

He had previously questioned Dr. Romer about the existence and reports of sea serpents, and it occurred to Romer to tell Mr. Cabot about the skeleton in the museum closet. Godfrey Cabot asked how much a restoration would cost: "Romer, pulling a figure out of the musty air, replied, 'Oh, about $10,000.'" Romer may not have been serious, but the philanthropist sent a check for said sum shortly afterwards. Two years - and more than $10,000 - later, after the careful labor of the museum preparators, the restored and mounted skeleton was displayed at Harvard in 1959. However, Dr. Romer and MCZ preparator Arnold Lewis confirmed that same year in the institution's journal Breviora that "erosion had destroyed a fair fraction of this once complete and articulated skeleton...so that approximately a third of the specimen as exhibited is plaster restoration." As well, the original bones remained layered in plaster; while this kept the fossils safe, it made it difficult for paleontologists to study them. This was a factor in subsequent controversy as to the true size of the Kronosaurus queenslandicus.

Size issues
However, more recent studies that compared fossil specimens of Kronosaurus to other pliosaurs suggest that the Harvard reconstruction may have included too many vertebrae, so as to exaggerate the previous estimate, with the true length probably only .

Namesakes

Taxonomic patronyms
In honor of Alfred Romer, several taxonomic patronyms were given in animals:
 Romeriida is the name for a clade that contains the diapsids and their closest relatives.
 Romeria is a genus of early captorhinids.
 Romeriscus is a genus from the early Pennsylvanian (Late Carboniferous) initially described as the oldest known amniote, but this is because limnoscelids were, at that time, considered amniotes by some authors. A subsequent study showed that the fossil lacks diagnostic characters and can only be assigned to Tetrapoda.
 Dromomeron romeri is a species of non-dinosaurian dinosauromorph named in July 2007. The genus name means 'running femur,' and the species name honors the paleontologist, a key figure in evolution research. The finding of these fossils was hailed as a breakthrough proving dinosaurs and other dinosauromorphs "lived together for as long as 15 to 20 million years."

Romer's gap
Romer was the first to recognise the gap in the fossil record between the tetrapods of the Devonian and the later Carboniferous period, a gap that has borne the name Romer's gap since 1995.

Romerogram

A romerogram, also called spindle diagram, or bubble diagram, is a diagram popularised by Alfred Romer.
It represents taxonomic diversity (horizontal width) against geological time (vertical axis) in order to reflect the variation of abundance of various taxa through time.

Books
Romer, A.S. 1933. Vertebrate Paleontology. University of Chicago Press, Chicago. (2nd ed. 1945; 3rd ed. 1966)
Romer, A.S. 1933. Man and the Vertebrates. University of Chicago Press, Chicago. (2nd ed. 1937; 3rd ed. 1941; 4th ed., retitled The Vertebrate Story, 1949)
Romer, A.S. 1949. The Vertebrate Body. W.B. Saunders, Philadelphia. (2nd ed. 1955; 3rd ed. 1962; 4th ed. 1970)
Romer, A.S. 1949. The Vertebrate Story. University of Chicago Press, Chicago. (4th ed. of Man and the Vertebrates)
Romer, A.S. 1956. Osteology of the Reptiles. University of Chicago Press, Chicago.
Romer, A.S. 1968. Notes and Comments on Vertebrate Paleontology. University of Chicago Press, Chicago.
Romer, A.S. & T.S. Parsons. 1977. The Vertebrate Body. 5th ed. Saunders, Philadelphia. (6th ed. 1985)

Sources

External links 
 Chrono-Biographical Sketch: Alfred S. Romer
 NAS Biography of Alfred Romer
 Alfred Sherwood Romer (AC 1917) Papers at the Amherst College Archives & Special Collections

1894 births
1973 deaths
Amherst College alumni
Columbia University alumni
American paleontologists
Harvard University faculty
University of Chicago faculty
Wollaston Medal winners
People from White Plains, New York
Penrose Medal winners
Foreign Members of the Royal Society
Scientists from New York (state)
Members of the American Philosophical Society